Kenny Molly (born 24 December 1996 in Izegem) is a Belgian cyclist, who currently rides for UCI Continental team .

Major results
2015
 7th Paris–Tours Espoirs
2018
 4th Eschborn–Frankfurt Under–23
 10th Omloop Het Nieuwsblad Beloften
2019
 9th Japan Cup
 9th Paris–Troyes
2020
 1st  Mountains classification Okolo Slovenska
2021 
 1st  Mountains classification Tour de Luxembourg
2022
 8th Overall International Tour of Hellas

References

External links

1996 births
Living people
Belgian male cyclists
People from Izegem
Sportspeople from West Flanders
21st-century Belgian people